Lasse Linjala (born 15 August 1987) is a Finnish former footballer who played as a striker.

External links
#17 Lasse Linjala
Veikkausliiga Player statistics

1987 births
Living people
Finnish footballers
Kokkolan Palloveikot players
JJK Jyväskylä players
FC KooTeePee players
FC Haka players
Mikkelin Palloilijat players
Vaasan Palloseura players
Vasa IFK players
Veikkausliiga players
Kakkonen players
Ykkönen players
Association football forwards
People from Pieksämäki
Sportspeople from South Savo